Atul Debbarma (born 8 January 1965) is an Indian doctor-turned-politician and author. He was a practicing doctor in the Municipal Corporation of Delhi until December 2017. He became involved with Rashtriya Swayamsevak Sangh (RSS) and its different wings such as Vanvasi Kalyan Ashram and Vivekananda International Foundation in 2007. He won the Tripura Assembly Elections 2018 as the BJP candidate from Krishnapur constituency.

Early life  
Atul Debbarma was born in Teliamura, Tripura to Ishwar Chandra Debbarma and Bidya Laxmi Debbarma. He graduated from High School and Higher Secondary School from Tripura Board of Secondary Education in first division. He completed his MBBS degree and earned a Diploma in Child Health from Nagpur University. He holds an LL. B degree from Delhi University.

Career 
He worked as a Medical Officer in a Mobile Health Team in Tripura ADC government from 1991-1992 during which he toured throughout the state. He joined the Municipal Corporation of Delhi as a Medical Officer in December 1992 through CMSE conducted by UPSC. He voluntarily retired from his post of Chief Medical Officer, Senior Administrative Grade in December 2017.

During his 25 years of service, he underwent many trainings from institutions including LBS National Academy of Administration (Mussoorie), Chulalongkorn University in Thailand (WHO Fellowship Program), Indian Institute of Public Administration (New Delhi), Central Health Education Bureau (New Delhi), National Institute of Health and Family Welfare (New Delhi).

Activism 
Debbarma associated himself with nationalist ideology in 1992 and became affiliated to BJP. He became an active member of RSS and has been associated with its different wings since 2007.

He founded many organizations pertaining to the cultural and social awakening of Tripuri people:

 Delhi Tripura Society, New Delhi – a social platform of Tripuri people residing in Delhi and NCR region.
 Tripur Kshatriya Samaj, Agartala – a socio-cultural platform of Tripuri community to safeguard, promote and practice Tripuri community’s social values, rituals, tradition, culture and heritage.
 Panch Tripur Sangh, Agartala – a socio-cultural umbrella organization comprising representatives of various tribal communities of Tripura including Jamatia, Noatia, Kaipeng, Molsom.
 Tripur Sanatan Hindu Sangh, Agartala - a religious organization comprising saints, sadhus, gurus and heads of ashrams and temples.
 Subrai Mission Trust, Agartala – a charitable organization to serve under-privileged people via health, education and philanthropic activities.
 Subrai Vidya Mandir, Agartala – an English Medium School with hostel facility for tribal boys and girls established near Agartala, where modern education is imparted along with Indian values. The school educates students up till 8th standard. Three branches of Subrai Vidya Mandir are running in rural areas.

He has supported activities such as distributing free medicines, giving health talks and distributing blankets to the underprivileged as part of free medical camps in rural areas. He organized events such as free yoga camps to promote cultural awakening among the youth.

He has written 2 short stories and a novel 1980 (based on 1980 riots in Tripura) in Kokborok. He published a Kokborok translation of the Bhagavad Gita with in-depth analysis. He translated the Rajmala (The Royal Chronicle of Tripura) and the Tripur Samhita to Kokborok. Another novel Mungkwrwi and a Kokborok translation of Gitanjali, though completed, are yet to be published. Among non-fictional works, he has written various essays, critical analyses and debates on issues on culture, customs, religion and spirituality in local dailies, magazines and periodicals in Kokborok, Bengali and English.

In 2001, he hosted website www.tripura.org, which provides in-depth information on various aspects of Tripura.

Personal life 
He has 3 younger siblings - 1 sister and 2 brothers. He is married to Madhabi Debbarma, also Chief Medical Officer in MCD, since 1993 and has 2 daughters.

Recognition 
His novel 1980 was praised by critics. It has been included in the curriculum of Tripura University. He was awarded the Radha Mohan Thakur Literary Award and the Salil Krishna Debbarman Memorial Award by Tripura Government in 2006 for this novel.

References

External links 
 
 

1965 births
Living people
Tripura MLAs 2018–2023